Beto Fuscão (born Rigoberto Costa; 13 April 1950 – 6 December 2022) was a Brazilian footballer who played as a defender.

Life and career 
Born in Florianópolis, Fuscão started his career as a Fluminense defender, and later went to play for Grêmio and Palmeiras, with whom he was vice-champion in the 1978 Campeonato Brasileiro Série A. In 1976 he was awarded a Bola de Prata (Silver Ball) for best defender, and the same year he received his first call from the Brazil national team, with whom he played several 1978 FIFA World Cup qualification games.

Fuscão died of stomach cancer on 6 December 2022, at the age of 72.

References

External links 
 

1950 births
2022 deaths
People from Santa Catarina (state)
Brazilian footballers
Association football defenders
Brazil international footballers
Fluminense FC players
Figueirense FC players
Esporte Clube São José players
Uberaba Sport Club players
Grêmio Foot-Ball Porto Alegrense players
Sociedade Esportiva Palmeiras players
Deaths from stomach cancer 
Deaths from cancer in Santa Catarina (state)